Talbach may refer to:

 Talbach (Ablach, Göggingen), a river of Baden-Württemberg, Germany, right tributary of the Ablach in Göggingen
 Talbach (Ablach, Menningen), a river of Baden-Württemberg, Germany, left tributary of the Ablach in Menningen

See also
 
 Joachim genannt Thalbach (disambiguation)